HD 119921 is a single, white-hued star in the southern constellation of Centaurus.  it has the Bayer designation z Centauri. This is faintly visible to the naked eye, having an apparent visual magnitude of 5.15. At that distance, the visual magnitude of this star is diminished by 0.15 from extinction due to interstellar dust.

This is an A-type main-sequence star with a stellar classification of A0 V, per Houk (1979). However, Gray & Garrison (1987) have it classed as B9.5 III-n, suggesting it is a more evolved giant star. HD 119921 is spinning rapidly with a projected rotational velocity of 220 km/s. The star is radiating around 125 times the Sun's luminosity from its photosphere at an effective temperature of 8,801 K.

In 1983, Molaro et al. reported the presence of super-ionized elements (triple-ionized carbon and silicon) in the far ultraviolet spectrum of HD 119921. These anomalous features are not normally detected from a star in this temperature range. Instead, these blue-shifted absorption features may originate in the local interstellar medium.

References

A-type main-sequence stars
B-type giants
Centaurus (constellation)
Centauri, z
Durchmusterung objects
119921
067244
5174